Zbog tebe may refer to:

Zbog tebe (Zdravko Čolić album), 1980
Zbog tebe (Indira Radić album), 1993